Gav (also Romanized as Gāv) is a village in Kaghazkonan-e Markazi Rural District, Kaghazkonan District, Meyaneh County, East Azerbaijan Province, Iran. At the 2006 census, its population was 384, in 96 families.

References 

 :|

Populated places in Meyaneh County